Therapy interfering behaviors or "TIBs" are, according to dialectical behavior therapy (DBT), things that get in the way of therapy. These are behaviors of either the patient or the therapist. More obvious examples include being late to sessions, not completing homework, cancelling sessions, and forgetting to pay. More subtle examples can include sobbing uncontrollably, venting, criticizing the therapist, threatening to quit therapy, shutting down, yelling, only reporting negative information, saying "I don't know" repeatedly, and pushing the therapist's limits. Behaviors that "burn out the therapist" are included, and thus, vary from therapist to therapist. These behaviors can occur in session, group, between sessions, and on the phone. 

DBT requires therapists to directly address TIBs as a way to prevent early termination from therapy, to improve the relationship between therapist and client, and to model effective communication. TIBs are the second most important target according to DBT, just below life-threatening behaviors. 

DBT is one of the first therapy models to identify problems between therapist and client in terms of behaviors rather than personality defects. Identifying TIB's to decrease (and identifying therapy enhancing behaviors) takes the place of the terms "transference" and "countertransference".

Books
Skills Training Manual for Treating Borderline Personality Disorder by Marsha M. Linehan 
Cognitive Behavioral Treatment of Borderline Personality Disorder by Marsha M. Linehan, 1993

See also
Therapeutic relationship
Psychological resistance
Negative therapeutic reaction

External links
 An Overview of Dialectical Behaviour Therapy - Psychiatry Online
National Institute of Mental Health (NIMH) Home Page
DBT WikiBook
DBT Self Help Web Site
DBT applied to Addiction/Substance Abuse
Traditional Diary Card Examples: http://www.dbtselfhelp.com/html/diary_card_1.html

Cognitive therapy